Ellen Pickering (1802 – 25 November 1843) was a British novelist who published sixteen three-volume novels, one of them posthumously. At a time when stories about gypsies were common in nineteenth-century Victorian literature, Pickering achieved her greatest success with the novel Nan Darrell, or The Gypsy Mother (1839). Her books mixed history and romance in the style of Sir Walter Scott.

Life and work
Ellen Pickering was baptized on 21st August 1802 at Lyndhurst, Hampshire near the family estate of Foxlease, to Isaac Pickering (of Kingston Lisle, (was Berkshire now Oxfordshire)) and Caroline nee Collins (from East Lockinge, (was Berkshire now Oxfordshire).  The Pickering family income was derived from the Trinidad and Virgin Islands Caribbean slave trade; when the practice was made illegal, the family moved to Bathwick a suburb of Bath, Somerset in South West England. Pickering had early success as a writer and she reputedly earned £100 a year after she started publishing in 1825. Her books mixed history and romance in the style of Sir Walter Scott. Pickering wrote sixteen three-volume novels up to 1840. 

Her novel Nan Darrell, or The Gypsy Mother (1839) was her most successful book and was reprinted five times up to 1865, years after her death.  The novel was first written just after the success of a gypsy trilogy published by British novelist Hannah Maria Jones (1784–1854).  The motif of gypsies, particularly in the fictional role of kidnappers, was popular in nineteenth-century Victorian literature. Nan Darrell, or The Gypsy Mother features a lead gypsy character reminiscent of Meg Merrilies from Scott's novel Guy Mannering.

Pickering died in Bath, Somerset, in 1843 of scarlet fever and was buried 29th November that year at St Mary's Church, Bathwick. Her partially complete novel The Grandfather was finished and published by her friend the novelist Elizabeth Youatt.

Legacy
Cultural historian Mary Poovey notes that Pickering "enjoyed success among her contemporaries but achieved no lasting legacy". Contemporary feminist scholars have debated the value of her work.

Selected works

Pickering published a total of sixteen novels. The Grandfather was published posthumously.
 The Marriage of the Favourite, or, She Bred Him a Soldier, 1826 
 The Heiress (three volumes), 1833
 Agnes Serle, 1835
 The Merchant's Daughter, 1836
 The Prince and the Pedlar, or The Siege of Bristol, 1839
 The Squire, 1837
 Nan Darrell, or The Gipsy Mother, 1839
 The Fright, 1839
 The Quiet Husband, 1840
 Who Shall Be Heir?, 1840
 The Secret Foe, 1841
 The Expectant, 1842
 Cousin Hinton, or, Friend or Foe?, 1843
 Charades for Acting, 1843
 The Grumbler, 1843
 The Grandfather, 1846 (completed by a friend) (An edition exists published in fragile tan wrappers with an imprint  of New York: Harper & Brothers, 1844. No. 39 - Library of Select Novels

Notes

References

Further reading
Rosenman, Ellen Bayuk and Claudia C. Kalaver (ed). (2008). Other Mothers: Beyond the Maternal Ideal. Ohio State University Press. . .
Wagner, Tamara (2009). Antifeminism and the Victorian Novel. Cambria Press. . .

1802 births
1843 deaths
British women novelists
19th-century British novelists
Deaths from streptococcus infection
Victorian women writers
Victorian novelists
People from Bath, Somerset